Amroha Assembly constituency is a constituency of the Amroha district of Uttar Pradesh.

Members of the Legislative Assembly

Election results

2022

2017

References

External links
 Official Site of Legislature in Uttar Pradesh
 Uttar Pradesh Government website
 UP Assembly 
 

Assembly constituencies of Uttar Pradesh
Amroha